School for the Deaf and Blind may refer to:
 Colorado School for the Deaf and Blind
 Florida School for the Deaf and Blind
 Hawaii School for the Deaf and the Blind
 Montana School for the Deaf & Blind
 South Carolina School for the Deaf and the Blind
 Virginia School for the Deaf and the Blind

See also
 Alabama Institute for the Deaf and Blind
 Arizona State Schools for the Deaf and Blind
 Utah Schools for the Deaf and the Blind
 West Virginia Schools for the Deaf and the Blind